The 1922 Southwest Texas State Bobcats football team was an American football team that represented the Southwest Texas State Normal College (now known as Texas State University) during the 1922 college football season as a member of the Texas Intercollegiate Athletic Association (TIAA). In their fourth year under head coach Oscar W. Strahan, the team compiled an overall record of 3–3 with a mark of 0–3 in conference play.

Schedule

References

Southwest Texas State
Texas State Bobcats football seasons
Southwest Texas State Bobcats football